MKE JNG-90 is a bolt-action sniper rifle that fires the 7.62×51mm NATO round used by the Turkish military. Development of the weapon first started back in 2004 to 2008. Its nickname is Bora and it is currently being offered for export.

Design
The JNG-90 was designed with the collaboration of Turkish Gendarmerie and Mechanical and Chemical Industry Corporation (MKEK). Designed by Capt. (Rtd.) Mustafa Dolar and Sgt. Mjr. Necmi Güngör, rifle is accurate in terms of shooting 0.3 MOA groups at up to 100 meters range according to MKEK tests. Picatinny rails are provided on the forend and on the upper receiver. The rifle also has an adjustable buttstock.

Users

: Purchased unknown number of JNG-90s.
: In use by the Turkish Armed Forces.
: Purchased unknown number of JNG-90s
: Purchased unknown number of JNG-90s
: Purchased unknown number  of JNG-90s

References

External links
 Official Page
 Military Factory site

Turkish inventions
Weapons and ammunition introduced in 2008
Bolt-action rifles
Sniper rifles of Turkey